The 1970 Soviet Class A First Group was a transitional season of the future Soviet First League. It was also the 30th season of the Soviet second tier league competition.

The league was reduced to a single group in comparison with the previous season.

Teams

Relegated teams 
FC Kairat Alma-Ata – placing 17th in 1969 Class A First Group, (Returning after 4 seasons)
FC Lokomotiv Moscow – placing 18th in 1969 Class A First Group, (Returning after 5 seasons)
FC Krylia Sovetov Kiubyshev – placing 19th in 1969 Class A First Group, (Returning after 8 seasons)
FC Uralmash Sverdlovsk – placing 20th (last) in 1969 Class A First Group, (Returning after a season)

Renamed teams 
 Energetik Dushanbe was renamed as Pamir Dushanbe.

Final standings

Top scorers
24 goals
 János Gabovda (Karpaty Lvov)

19 goals
 Yury Sevidov (Kairat Alma-Ata)

18 goals
 Eugen Piunovschi (Shakhter Karaganda)

17 goals
 Viktor Abgoltz (Kairat Alma-Ata)

16 goals
 Boris Govorunov (Dinamo Leningrad)

Number of teams by union republic

See also
 Soviet First League

External links
 1970 season. RSSSF

1970
2
Soviet
Soviet